Khoon Pasina (Blood and Sweat) is a 1977 Hindi action crime film. The movie is produced by Baboo Mehra and directed by Rakesh Kumar. The movie stars Amitabh Bachchan, Vinod Khanna, Rekha, Nirupa Roy, Asrani, Aruna Irani, Bharat Bhushan and Kader Khan. The music is by Kalyanji Anandji. This was another "super hit" movie of Amitabh Bachchan. A comedic action scene featuring Bachchan fighting a tiger as well as a taciturn Vinod Khanna are the highlights of the movie.

It was remade in Telugu as Tiger (1979) with N. T. Rama Rao and in Tamil by Rajinikanth as Siva (1989).

Plot
Two great friends get separated and their families are terminated by the main villain. The two boys grow up and fight crime individually. One of them, Shiva/Tiger (Amitabh Bachan), is good natured and socially amiable and has a mother.  Eventually, he falls in love with the heroine (Rekha) and marries her. Shiva gets blamed for the murder of an innocent farmer (Asrani).  On his mother's and wife's behest, Shiva leaves the village and tries to lead a honest and nonviolent life in a faraway village. The other hero Shera/Aslam (Vinod Khanna) too fights crime and criminals but is taciturn and a loner. He gets entrusted with the task of avenging Asrani's death. He tracks Shiva and eventually they both realize that they are long lost friends. Shera also learns that Shiva is innocent. Both of them team up and beat up all the villains.

Cast

 Amitabh Bachchan as Shiva / Tiger
 Vinod Khanna as Aslam Sher Khan / Shera
 Rekha as Chanda
 Nirupa Roy as Shiva's mother
 Asrani as Mohan Sharma
 Kader Khan as Zaalim Singh
 Ranjeet as Raghu
 Bharat Bhushan as Kaka
 Aruna Irani
 Mohan Sherry
 Helen as the dancer

Soundtrack

References

External links 
 

1977 films
1970s Hindi-language films
Films scored by Kalyanji Anandji
Hindi films remade in other languages